In 1887, Antonín Dvořák selected 12 of the 18 love songs from his collection Cypresses (Czech: Cypřiše), B.11, of 1865, and arranged them for string quartet, B.152. He also named these 12 pieces Cypresses. The 12 pieces he selected from B. 11 are Nos. 2–4, 6–9, 12, 14, and 16–18; the original songs are for solo voice and piano, and are settings of poems by Gustav Pfleger-Moravsky from the collection "Cypresses" (hence the title).

Background 

10 of these (1–9 & 11) were edited by Josef Suk and published by Hudební Matice Umělecké Besedy in 1921; the complete set of 12 appear in Soubourne kritické vydání, the Complete Critical Edition, from 1957. They were originally titled Echos of Songs, later Evening Songs, under which name numbers 1–3 & 9 were given their 1st performance by Karel Ondříček, Jan Pelikan, Petr Mares & Alois Neruda, at Umělecká beseda, on 6 January 1888. Dvořák inscribed them "These little compositions were originally songs (18), four of which were published as Op. 2 by Stary... I wrote them in 1865 and now, after 22 years, I have arranged them for quartet under the title 'The Echo of Songs'". They were given their present title by Josef Suk.

Structure 

The original songs are clearly recognisable in these string quartet arrangements, with melodic line, rhythm and harmony unchanged. For No.11, Dvořák changed the key, and half of them he extended by repetition, mostly with some interchange of allocation of lines to the different instruments.

The pieces are as follows:

Notes

References 

See also:  English language version of page about the Cypresses for String Quartet at Czech site

External links

Dvorak Cypresses
1887 compositions
Dvořák